Spiranthes tuberosa, commonly called little lady's tresses, little pearl-twist and slender ladies'-tresses is an orchid species. It is a perennial plant native to North America.

The basal leaves are short-lived, blooming plants having pure white flowers spirally arranged around the single-stemmed inflorescence; the plants grow in grasslands and open woods.

Legal status
It is listed as a special concern in Connecticut, as threatened in Florida, as exploitably vulnerable in New York (state), as extirpated in Pennsylvania, and as endangered in Rhode Island.

References

tuberosa
Flora of the Northeastern United States
Flora of the Southeastern United States
Flora of the North-Central United States
Flora of the South-Central United States
Orchids of the United States
Flora without expected TNC conservation status